Milk Man is the sixth album by the band Deerhoof, released in 2004. It is something of a concept album, based on a character (the "Milk Man" shown on the cover of the album), created by Japanese artist Ken Kagami, a friend of the band. The album was remastered and reissued in 2011 by ATP Recordings.

Track listing

Personnel
 Chris Cohen – guitar
 John Dieterich – guitar
 Satomi Matsuzaki – bass guitar, vocals
 Greg Saunier – drums, vocals

References

Deerhoof albums
2004 albums
5 Rue Christine albums
Kill Rock Stars albums
ATP Recordings albums